The New Ethics is a 1907 book by the American zoologist and philosopher J. Howard Moore, in which he advocates for a form of ethics, that he calls the New Ethics, which applies the principle of the Golden Rule—treat others as you would want to be treated yourself—to all sentient beings. It expands on the ideas espoused in his 1906 book, The Universal Kinship.

Summary 
Moore starts by examining how many new ideas are attacked and ridiculed before they eventually find acceptance in society. He then lays out his thesis of the New Ethics, arguing that humans are simply individual sentient beings, existing alongside a number of other sentient beings, differing only in degree, not in kind. Moore asserts that the Golden Rule, which he calls "The Great Law", is applicable to all beings, regardless of their species membership. He contends that the New Ethics is an ethical consequence of Darwin's theory of evolution, which established that all beings are related to each other and that it rejected the anthropocentric belief that non-human animals were produced for the benefit of humans.

Moore then explores human attitudes towards others, looking at both their treatment of other humans and other animals. He laments how humans have become masters over the earth, but have not recognized their responsibilities towards their fellow beings, instead becoming butchers by harming the beings they have duties towards, such as through vivisection, hunting and slaughtering them for food. Moore then criticizes what he considers to be the most common objection to the New Ethics thesis: that it is necessary for humans to exploit others to provide for their needs and desires; he argues that the objection is egotistical because it fails to consider the perspective of the victims.

He then argues that non-human animals have made, and continue to make, significant contributions to the development of human civilization and that humans treat these beings as mere means to an end. Moore contends that the ideal relationship would be one were humans and other animals work together for their mutual benefit. Moore then criticizes the use of animal products, such as fur, for human clothing and describes alternative methods for humans to clothe themselves using plant-based materials. He argues that current developments will lead to a future where humans no longer clothe themselves in animal-based clothing. He then looks at the question of what humans should eat, exploring the nutrients that humans require and examining human physiology, determining that humans are naturally herbivores; he concludes that the ideal diet is vegetarian.

Moore also criticises the claim that humans are required to kill other animals to prevent overpopulation, as well as the use of the survival of the fittest and an appeal to nature as objections against the New Ethics. Moore then sketches the evolutionary development of society—highlighting people such as Copernicus, Galileo and Darwin who have made significant contributions to human progress—and making a case for socialism and the women's movement. He concludes the book by asserting that the popularity or unpopularity of a proposition has no bearing on its truth or falsity and describing his dream of a future celestial civilization where humans are no longer savages and they instead live in justice and brotherhood with every sentient being.

Reception 
A review in the socialist magazine The New Age, described the book as uneven and overly sentimental, but felt that Moore redeemed himself in the conclusion. The Westminster Review's review highlighted the shortness of the book, described the books central thesis as "extremist altruism" and contended that the book made excellent points.

In 1931, C. M. Knight wrote positively of the book, stating:Some readers may not approve of Mr. Moore's warm enthusiasm, fervent language, and eloquent indictment of the shortcomings of men, and may wish that he had produced a cold scientific work on the subject; but those who have the humane cause at heart will not carp at methods, and will even overlook lapses from good taste and rejoice in all books which stimulate thought and arouse men form apathy, the greatest curse in the world and the worst stumbling-block in the way of all reform.

Editions 
The book was dedicated to Tess, the pet name for Moore's wife, Jennie; they were both admirers of the character Tess from Tess of the D'Urbervilles by Thomas Hardy.

The first edition was published by Ernest Bell in London, in 1907. A revised edition was published by Samuel A. Bloch, in Chicago, in 1909.

References

Further reading

External links 
 
  (revised edition)

1907 non-fiction books
Animal ethics books
Books about animal rights
Books about animal testing
Books about socialism
Books about vegetarianism
Books about wild animal suffering
Books by J. Howard Moore
English non-fiction books
Works about utilitarianism